Prall's Island is an uninhabited island in the Arthur Kill between Staten Island, New York, and Linden, New Jersey, in the United States. The  island is one of the minor islands that are part of the borough of Staten Island in New York City.

The island is named for a descendant or descendants of early Staten Island settler Arendt Jansen Prall Van Naarden (c. 1647-1725) (in Dutch, Praal), probably his grandson Abraham Prall (1706–1775), a local farmer. It was originally known as Dongan's Island, after New York Governor Thomas Dongan (1634–1715), who took the office in 1688. The name was later corrupted to Duncan's Island. Prall's Island did not take hold until the late 19th century. The island is now owned by the City of New York and is maintained by New York City Department of Parks and Recreation as a bird sanctuary.

See also
Geography of New York–New Jersey Harbor Estuary

References

 NYC Audubon Harbor Herons Project

Islands of New York City
Uninhabited islands of New York (state)
Islands of Staten Island
Protected areas of Staten Island
Nature reserves in New York (state)
Bird sanctuaries of the United States